Allen Township is a township in Polk County, Iowa, United States.

History
Allen Township was organized in 1848. It is named for Captain James Allen.

References

Townships in Polk County, Iowa
Townships in Iowa
1848 establishments in Iowa
Populated places established in 1848